Audubon Park is a home rule-class city in central Jefferson County, Kentucky, United States. The population was 1,473 at the 2010 census.

History

The land was sold to G. Robert Hunt in 1906, and the Audubon Park Country Club was built by avid golfer Russell Houston. The Audubon Park Realty Co. purchased the land in 1912 and named the neighborhood after wildlife painter John James Audubon. All but two of the city's 20 streets are named after birds.

Development was very slow until Louisville Gas and Electric laid gas mains and installed streetlights in the 1920s, at which point it was estimated that a new house was begun every two weeks. Most houses are traditional in design, with styles including Neo-colonial, Dutch colonial and Neo-federal, though some Craftsman-style California bungalows are present.

An early streetcar spur route ran to a station house near the center of the park (the station house has been converted to a private residence and still stands). The line was discontinued in the 1920s, although the tracks were not entirely removed until 1975. The city was formally incorporated by the state assembly in 1941.

The city is known for its straight, tree-lined streets (facilitated by rear utility lines where possible) and six small neighborhood parks. Its entrances are marked by large stone gateways. Two annual traditions are the spring dogwood festival, and the fall Arts and Crafts festival. The city was listed on the National Register of Historic Places in 1996.

Geography
Audubon Park is located at 38°12'18" north, 85°43'39" west (38.204970, -85.727598).

Demographics

As of the census of 2000, there were 1,545 people, 619 households, and 433 families residing in the city. The racial makeup of the city was 98.19% White, 0.26% Black or African American, 0.06% Native American, 0.45% Asian, 0.00% Pacific Islander, 0.13% from other races, and 0.91% from two or more races. 0.52% of the population were Hispanic or Latino of any race.

There were 619 households, out of which 30.9% had children under the age of 18 living with them, 59.0% were married couples living together, 7.6% had a female householder with no husband present, and 30.0% were non-families. 26.0% of all households were made up of individuals, and 16.0% had someone living alone who was 65 years of age or older. The average household size was 2.50 and the average family size was 3.05.

In the city, the population was spread out, with 25.2% under the age of 18, 6.2% from 18 to 24, 24.1% from 25 to 44, 27.0% from 45 to 64, and 17.5% who were 65 years of age or older. The median age was 42 years. For every 100 females, there were 94.3 males. For every 100 females age 18 and over, there were 86.2 males.

The median income for a household in the city was $60,000, and the median income for a family was $75,520. Males had a median income of $51,167 versus $32,679 for females. The per capita income for the city was $31,162. 5.1% of the population and 3.7% of families were below the poverty line. 3.9% of those under the age of 18 and 7.8% of those 65 and older were living below the poverty line.

Climate
The climate in this area is characterized by hot, humid summers and generally mild to cool winters.  According to the Köppen Climate Classification system, Audubon Park has a humid subtropical climate, abbreviated "Cfa" on climate maps.

See also
 National Register of Historic Places listings in Jefferson County, Kentucky

References

External links
 Official city webpage
 Book, Audubon Country Club: A Centennial Celebration, 1908–2008. Louisville: Butler Books, 2008.

Cities in Kentucky
National Register of Historic Places in Louisville, Kentucky
Louisville metropolitan area
Populated places established in 1912
Cities in Jefferson County, Kentucky
1912 establishments in Kentucky
Historic districts on the National Register of Historic Places in Kentucky